Palepoi is a Samoan surname.  Notable people with the surname include:

Anton Palepoi (born 1978), American football player, brother of Tenny Palepoi
Opeta Palepoi (born 1975), Samoan rugby union player
Tenny Palepoi (born 1990), American football player, brother of Anton Palepoi

Samoan-language surnames